Albert Mark Patch (1933-2015) was an Australian rugby league footballer who played in the 1950s and 1960s.

Career
Originally from Lismore, New South Wales, Patch picked up a contact from Western Suburbs in 1956 and stayed with them for five seasons until the end of 1961. 

Patch was a fierce forward and enforcer for Wests during this period, and played in two losing grand finals: 1958 and 1961. He represented New South Wales on three occasions in 1957 and 1959. After retiring from Sydney, Patch joined Yass as a Captain-coach for some years.

He lived in retirement in the New South Wales north coast town of Yamba, and died there on 17 August 2015, aged 82.

References

1933 births
2015 deaths
Australian rugby league players
New South Wales rugby league team players
City New South Wales rugby league team players
Rugby league players from Lismore, New South Wales
Rugby league props
Western Suburbs Magpies players